The 2021 season is FC Chitwan's 1st Nepal Super League season.

Season overview

On 15 March, FC Chitwan announced the signing of Nepal national football team striker Bharat Khawas as its marquee player.

On the auction of Nepal Super League, FC Chitwan acquired various players such as goalkeeper Bishal Sunuwar, Bikash Khawas, Tej Budhathoki, etc.

On 1st April, FC Chitwan called Syansu Bhusal to join the team.

FC Chitwan announced the signing of three overseas player, El Sayed Shaaban and Ahmed Bogy from Egypt, and Goran Jerković from France.

Competition

Nepal Super League

Results

League table

Statistics

Goalscorers

References

External links
Nepal Super League 2021

Added wiki of FC Chitwan's 2021 NSL Season 
Lalitpur City FC
Nepalese football clubs 2021 season